The Apostolic Vicariate of Jolo is a Latin Catholic missionary pre-diocesan jurisdiction covering the Sulu and Tawi-Tawi provinces in southern Philippines.

It is directly exempt to the Holy See, specifically Roman Congregation for the Evangelization of Peoples and not part of any ecclesiastical province, yet for the purpose of apostolic cooperation sometimes grouped with the Archdiocese of Zamboanga.

Its cathedral episcopal see is the Cathedral of Our Lady of Mount Carmel, in Jolo, Sulu, Bangsamoro Autonomous Region in Muslim Mindanao (BARMM).

History 

Established on 28 October 1953 as Apostolic Prefecture of Sulu, of territory split off from the then Territorial Prelature of Cotabato and Sulu (now diocese of Cotabato).

Promoted and renamed after its see on 12 July 1958 as Apostolic Vicariate of Jolo, led by a titular bishop.

Ordinaries 
Apostolic Prefect of Sulu
 Francis Joseph McSorley (1954 – 1958.07.12)
Apostolic Vicars of Jolo
 Francis Joseph McSorley (1958.07.12 – death 1970.11.20), Titular Bishop of Sozusa in Palæstina (1958.07.12 – 1970.11.20)
 Philip Francis Smith (1972.06.26 – retired 1979.04.11), Titular Bishop of Lamphua (1972.06.26 – 1980.03.14), later Coadjutor Bishop of Cotabato (Philippines) (1979.04.11 – 1979.11.05), succeeded as Metropolitan Archbishop of Cotabato (1979.11.05 – 1998.05.30)
 George Eli Dion (1980.01.28 – death 1999.02.12), Titular Bishop of Caudium (1980.01.28 – 1999.02.12)
 Benjamin de Jesus (1991.10.11 – death 1997.02.04)
 Angelito Lampon (21 November 1997 – 6 November 2018), Titular Bishop of Valliposita (1997.11.21 – 2018.11.06), succeeded as Metropolitan Archbishop of Cotabato (2018.11.06 –)
 Romeo Sombilon Saniel (2018.12.16-2020.04.04), Apostolic Administrator
 Charile M.Inzon (2020.04.04-present)

References

External links 
 Claretian Publications; Apostolic Vicariate of Jolo
 GCatholic with incumbent bio links
 Decree of 28 October 1953 - decree establishing the apostolic vicariates of Jolo and Cotabato, published in the Acta Apostolicae Sedis vol 46 (1954), pp. 66-67 
 Apostolic constitution of 12 July 1958 - papal bull raising the dignity of the Apostolic Prefecture as the Apostolic Vicariate of Jolo, published in the Acta Apostolicae Sedis vol 51 (1959), pp. 319-320

Christian organizations established in 1953
Apostolic vicariates